This list of World War II films (1950–1989) contains fictional feature films or miniseries released since 1950 which feature events of World War II in the narrative.

The entries on this list are war films or miniseries that are concerned with World War II (or the Sino-Japanese War) and include events which feature as a part of the war effort.

Common topics
Many aspects of this conflict have repeatedly been the subject of drama. These common subjects will not be linked when they appear in the film descriptions below:

Europe
Adolf Hitler, Nazis and Nazism
Nazi Germany and the Third Reich
Gestapo and SS
Benito Mussolini
Death camps, Nazi concentration camps, earlier concentration camps
Partition and occupation of Poland and Polish resistance
Occupied France, Vichy France and French Resistance
Occupied Norway
The Holocaust

Asia–Pacific
Emperor Hirohito

Non-geographical
POW

Early 1950s

Late 1950s

Early 1960s

Late 1960s

Early 1970s

{| class="wikitable sortable" style="width:100%;"
|-
! class="unsortable"|Year
! width= 80|Country
! width=160|Main title(Alternative titles)
! width=140|Original title(Original script)
! width=100|Director
! class="unsortable"|Battles, campaigns, events depicted
|-
|1970
|Italy
|Overrun
|La lunga notte dei disertori – I 7 di Marsa Matruh
|Mario Siciliano
|Drama. A group of British soldiers are determined to get back to their own lines, picking up more allied survivors along the way.

|-
|1970
|Greece
|Lieutenant Natasha
|Ipolochagos Natassa (Υπολοχαγός Νατάσσα)
|Nikos Foskolos
|Drama. Woman in the Greek resistance sent to Dachau
|-
|1970
|United States
|Carter's Army AKA Black Brigade (TV)
|
|George McCowan
|Blaxploitation Western Front
|-
|1970
|United States
|Catch-22
|
|Mike Nichols
|Italian Campaign
|-
|1970
|ItalySpain
|Churchill's Leopards
|I leopardi di Churchill 
|Maurizio Pradeaux
|English agent, posing as dead German officer twin, assists French Resistance and British commandos against SS, 1944
|-
|1970
|Italy
|Corbari
|Corbari
|Valentino Orsini
|Italian resistance movement
|-
|1970
|Poland
|Face of an Angel
|Twarz anioła
|Zbigniew Chmielewski
|Drama. Children in Nazi concentration camp in Łódź, Poland 
|-
|1970
|Philippines
|Guerrilla Strike Force
|Maharlika
|Jerry Hopper
|Japanese invasion of Manila Bay Released in 1987
|-
|1970
|United States
|Hell Boats
|
|Paul Wendkos
|British motor torpedo boats operating in Mediterranean
|-
|1970
|United StatesItaly
|Hornets' Nest
|
|Phil Karlson, Franco Cirino
|US paratrooper and boy partisans attack dam during Italian Campaign
|-
|1970
|United StatesYugoslavia
|Kelly's Heroes
|
|Brian G. Hutton
|Western Front
|-
|1970
|Poland
|Kolumbowie
|Kolumbowie
|Janusz Morgenstern
|Powstanie Warszawskie, 1944
|-
|1970
|United Kingdom
|
| 
|Walter Grauman
|Allied commandos on mission to kidnap German scientists, 1945; shot in 1968
|-
|1970
|Japan
|
|Saigo no Tokkotai
|Yahagi Toshihiko
|Kamikaze attacks
|-
|1970
|PolandSoviet Union
|Legenda
|Legenda 
|Sylwester Chęciński
|Polish resistance
|-
|1970
|Italy
|
|Io non scappo... fuggo
|Franco Prosperi
|Comedy. War in Sicily and in Italy
|-
|1970
|United Kingdom
| (Escape)
|
|Lamont Johnson
|Irish intelligence officer investigates German POW camp disturbances in Scotland near end of war
|-
|1970
|Denmark
|October Days 
|Oktoberdage
|Bent Christensen
|
|-
|1970
|Poland
|Olympic Fire
|Znicz olimpijski
|Lech Lorentowicz
|Zakopane, Polish resistance in Tatra Mountains
|-
|1970
|Italy
|Operation Snafu (Situation Normal: AFU)
|Rosolino Paternò, soldato...
|Nanni Loy
|American landing in Sicily
|-
|1970
|United States
|Patton
|
|Franklin Schaffner
|1970 Best Picture chronicling the campaigns of General George S. Patton
|-
|1970
|Philippines
|Santiago!
|Santiago!
|Lino Brocka
|Life in occupied Philippines
|-
|1970
|ItalySoviet Union
|Sunflower
|I Girasoli
|Vittorio De Sica
|Romance-drama. End of war search for Italian soldier lost on Eastern Front
|-
|1970
|United States
|Too Late the Hero (Suicide Run)
|
|Robert Aldrich
|British commando raid in the Pacific Campaign
|-
|1970
|United StatesJapan
|Tora! Tora! Tora!
|Tora Tora Tora! (トラ・トラ・トラ!)
|Richard Fleischer, Kinji Fukasaku, Toshio Masuda
|Attack on Pearl Harbor
|-
|1970
|Japan
|Turning Point of Showa History: The Militarists
|Gekido no showashi 'Gunbatsu (激動の昭和史 軍閥)
|Hiromichi Horikawa
|Hideki Tōjō's biography during Pacific War
|-
|1971
|Japan
|
|Gekido no Showashi: Okinawa kessen (激動の昭和史 沖縄決戦)
|Kihachi Okamoto
|Battle of Okinawa through eyes of Japanese Army, Navy, aviation, civilians, and generals
|-
|1971
|United States
| (Colditz: Escape of the Birdmen) (TV)
|
|Philip Leacock
|Adventure. POWs in castle prison build glider
|-
|1971
|United Kingdom
|Dad's Army
|
|Norman Cohen
|Comedy based on Dad's Army TV series. British Home Guard
|-
|1971
|Italy
| 
|La lunga ombra del lupo
|Gianni Manera
|Italian Civil War
|-
|1971
|South Africa
|Mr. Kingstreet's War
|
|Percival Rubens
|East African Campaign
|-
|1971
|United Kingdom
|Murphy's War
|
|Peter Yates
|Battle of the South Atlantic
|-
|1971
|Yugoslavia
|
|U gori raste zelen bor
|Antun Vrdoljak
|A Yugoslav Communist Party commissioner is sent to a lowland village to monitor the local partisans
|-
|1971
|United States
|Raid on Rommel
|
|Henry Hathaway
|North African campaign Reuses footage from Tobruk (1967)
|-
|1971
|Philippines
|Sangre
|Sangre 
|Armando Garces
|Battle of Filipino Guerrillas with the Imperial Japanese Army
|-
|1971
|Poland
|
|Trzecia część nocy
|Andrzej Żuławski
|Polish Resistance
|-
|1971
|Bulgaria
|Three Reservists
|Trimata ot zapasa (Тримата от запаса)
|Zako Heskija
|Comedy-drama. Bulgarian soldiers in Hungary, 1945
|-
|1971
|Poland
|Top Agent
|Agent nr 1
|Zbigniew Kuźmiński
|Jerzy Iwanow-Szajnowicz, Polish SOE agent in Greek Resistance
|-
|1971
|Soviet Union
|Trial on the Road
|Proverka na dorogakh (Проверка на дорогах)
|Aleksei German
|Former Russian POW joins partisans, Winter 1942
|-
|1971
|Greece
|What Did You Do in the War, Thanasi?
|Ti ekanes ston polemo, Thanasi? (Τι έκανες στον πόλεμο, Θανάση)
|Dinos Katsouridis
|Anti-war comedy. Hapless man caught up between the Greek Resistance and the Germans
|-
|1972
|India
|Challenge
|Lalkaar
|Ramanand Sagar
|Drama based on book by Ramanand Sagar (writer). Indian Army and Indian Air Force action against a secret Japanese Air Strip construction between Burma and Assam, near Indian state of Nagaland, 1942
|-
|1972
|Soviet Union
|
|A zori zdes tikhie (А зори здесь тихие)
|Stanislav Rostotsky
|Drama based on book by Boris Vasilyev. Female Soviet anti-aircraft squad encounter with platoon of Nazi paratroopers on Karelian Front, 1941
|-
|1972
|Soviet Union
|Hot Snow
|Goryachiy Sneg (Горячий снег)
|Gavriil Egiazarov
|Drama based on Yuri Bondarev novel. German attempt to extract Sixth Army from Stalingrad in Winter of 1942
|-
|1972
|Japan
|Under the Flag of the Rising Sun
|Gunki hatameku motoni (軍旗はためく下に)
|Kinji Fukasaku
|Japanese veterans recall experiences to a war widow on quest to exonerate husband executed for desertion
|-
|1972
|Yugoslavia
|Walter Defends Sarajevo
|Valter brani Sarajevo (Валтер брани Сарајево)
|Hajrudin Krvavac
|Partisans try to prevent the Germans to use a fuel depot in Sarajevo during their retreat from the Balkans in late 1944
|-
|1973
|Poland
|Barbed Wire
|Zasieki
|Andrzej Jerzy Piotrowski
|Polish Campaign, 1939; Soviet Gulag, Eastern Front, 1943
|-
|1973
|Yugoslavia
|
|Sutjeska (Сутјеска)
|Stipe Delić
|Battle of the Sutjeska
|-
|1973
|Yugoslavia
|Bombers 
|Bombaši (Бомбаши)
|Predrag Golubović
|Two Yugoslav partisans must blow up some bunkers in order to stop the Germans
|-
|1973
|United States
|Death Race (State of Division) (TV)
|
|David Lowell Rich
|German panzer chases American P-40 across North African desert, 1942
|-
|1973
|Philippines
|Dugo ng Bayan
|Dugo ng Bayan
|Armando A. Herrera
|Remake. Filipino Resistance.
|-
|1973
|United KingdomItaly
|Hitler: The Last Ten Days
|
|Ennio De Concini
|Last days of Hitler during Battle of Berlin
|-
|1973
|Poland
|Hubal
|Hubal
|Bohdan Poręba
|Henryk Dobrzański in Polish Campaign, 1939–1940
|-
|1973
|China
|Little 8th Route Army
|Xiaobalu (小八路)
|Lei You
|Animated. Sino-Japanese War
|-
|1973
|Italy
|Massacre in Rome
|Rappresaglia
|George P. Cosmatos
|Ardeatine massacre
|-
|1973
|FranceItaly
|Now Where Did the 7th Company Get to?
|Mais où est donc passée la septième compagnie? 
|Robert Lamoureux
|Comedy. French signal corpsmen during May 1940 débâcle; first of trilogy
|-
|1973
|Ukrainian SSR
|Only "Old Men" Are Going Into Battle
|В бой идут одни «старики»
|Leonid Bykov
| Fighter pilots of Soviet Air Forces Vs Luftwaffe clash before Battle of the Dnieper 
|-
|1973
|France
| (The Last Train)
|Le Train
|Pierre Granier-Deferre
|Based on Georges Simenon novel. Frenchman and Jewish-German woman meet on train while escaping German army to France
|-
|1973
|Hong KongSouth Korea
|When Taekwondo Strikes
|Tai quan zhen jiu zhou (跆拳震九州) 
|Feng Huang
|Martial arts. Japanese occupation of Korea
|-
|1974
|United Kingdom
|Adolf Hitler: My Part in His Downfall
|
|Norman Cohen
|Comedy. Basic training of British conscripts
|-
|1974
|France
|Black Thursday
|Les guichets du Louvre
|Michel Mitrani
|First large-scale roundup of Jews in Paris and man saving as many as possible, 1942
|-
|1974
|Estonian SSR
|
|Ohtlikud mängud  Opasnye igry (Опасные игры) 
|Veljo Käsper
|Occupation of Estonia by Nazi Germany
|-
|1974
|Bulgaria
|Dawn Over the Drava
|Zarevo nad Drava (Зарево над Драва)
|Zako Heskija
|Drama. Battle of the Drava, 1945
|-
|1974
|Taiwan
|
|Ying lie qian qiu (英烈千秋)
|Tin Shan Sui
|Biography of Zhang Zizhong during Sino-Japanese War
|-
|1974
|United States
| (TV)
|
|Lamont Johnson
|Drama based on William Bradford Huie book. Pvt. Eddie Slovik, the only US soldier to be executed for desertion during war
|-
|1974
|Japan
|Father of the Kamikaze
|Ā Kessen Kōkūtai (あゝ決戦航空隊)
|Kosaku Yamashita
|Drama. Admiral Takijirō Ōnishi
|-
|1974
|Poland
|Heads Full of Stars
|Głowy pełne gwiazd
|Janusz Kondratiuk
|Eastern Front and German Occupation of Poland, 1944
|-
|1974
|Japan
|Karafuto Summer 1945: Gate of Ice and Snow
|Karafuto 1945 Summer Hyosetsu no Mon (樺太1945年夏 氷雪の門)
|Mitsuo Murayama
|Soviet invasion of Karafuto prompts nine Japanese women to commit suicide
|-
|1974
|FranceWest GermanyItaly
|Lacombe Lucien (Lacombe, Lucien)
|Lacombe Lucien 
|Louis Malle
|French Resistance and collaboration
|-
|1974
|Italy
|Last Days of Mussolini
|Mussolini ultimo atto
|Carlo Lizzani
|The last days of Benito Mussolini
|-
|1974
|Yugoslavia
|Red Attack 
|Crveni Udar (Црвени удар)
|Predrag Golubović
|Resistance in a mine in German-occupied Kosovo
|-
|1974
|PolandSoviet Union
|Remember Your Name
|Zapamiętaj imię swoje Pomni imya svoye (Помни имя свое) 
|Siergiej Kołosow
|Tragedy of children in war
|-
|1974
|Italy
|Salvo D'Acquisto
|Salvo D'Acquisto
|Romolo Guerrieri
|Salvo D'Acquisto
|-
|1974
|United Kingdom
|Undercovers Hero
|Soft Beds, Hard Battle
|Roy Boulting
|Comedy. Brothel during the German occupation of France
|-
|1974
|Yugoslavia
|
|Užička republika (Ужичка република)
|Žika Mitrović
|Drama. Short-lived partisan Republic of Užice, 1941
|}

Late 1970s

Early 1980s

Late 1980s

Since 1990

Science fiction, fantasy, and horror

TV series

 See also 
List of World War II short films
List of World War II documentary films
List of Allied propaganda films of World War II
List of Holocaust films
List of films based on war books – includes World War II section
List of partisan films – films about World War II in Yugoslavia
Honorable mentions
Buona Sera, Mrs. Campbell (1968) – Italian girl with 3 fathers, all US Army
The Producers (1968) – Broadway Nazi musical
Zelig (1983) – Woody Allen as a Nazi Brownshirt

References

Note
 This English language title is a literal translation from its original foreign language title.This title should always be replaced by an English language release''' title when that information becomes available.

Sources
Leyda, Jay. Kino: A History of the Russian and Soviet Film – A study of the development of Russian cinema, from 1896 to the present''. London: George Allen & Unwin, 1960. Princeton, New Jersey: Princeton University Press, 3rd edition, 1983. 513 pp.

External links
 wwii-movies.com List of World War II Movies
 World War 2 movies – reviews and trailers for popular World War II movies.

Articles needing Indic script or text
Lists of World War II films